Advanced Dungeons & Dragons: Heroes of the Lance is a video game released in January 1988 for various home computer systems and consoles. The game is based on the first Dragonlance campaign module for the Dungeons & Dragons fantasy role-playing game, Dragons of Despair, and the first Dragonlance novel Dragons of Autumn Twilight. Heroes of the Lance focuses on the journey of eight heroes through the ruined city of Xak Tsaroth, where they must face the ancient dragon Khisanth and retrieve the relic, the Disks of Mishakal.

Gameplay

Heroes of the Lance is a side-scrolling action game. Even if it is a faithful representation of a portion of the novel Dragons of Autumn Twilight, it was a departure from the role-playing game module Dragons of Despair the book itself is based on.

The eight heroes from the Dragonlance series are assembled for the quest, but only one is visible on the screen at a time; when the on-screen hero dies, the next in line appears. Heroes of the Lance uses Dungeons & Dragons game statistics, with character statistics taken exactly from the rule books. Three characters have special abilities (healing magic, wizard magic, and trap removal), but the other five merely act as "lives" for the player as in traditional action-platforming games.

Plot

Characters
The eight heroes that make up the party are:
Goldmoon, a princess who brandishes the Blue Crystal Staff, an artifact whose powers she seeks to fully understand.
Sturm Brightblade, a powerful and solemn knight.
Caramon Majere, A warrior who makes up for his lack of intelligence with pure strength and fighting prowess. 
Raistlin Majere, Caramon's twin brother; a sly and brilliant, but frail, mage.
Tanis Half-Elven, the 'natural leader' of the heroes, and good with a bow.
Tasslehoff Burrfoot, a kender pickpocket.
Riverwind, Goldmoon's betrothed. He is a noble and wise warrior.
Flint Fireforge, a grizzled dwarven warrior.

Development
Heroes of the Lance was based on the original Dragonlance novels written by Margaret Weis and Tracy Hickman. Heroes of the Lance was not part of the Gold Box series; the nickname for these other D&D titles were "Silver Box" games. The NES version was developed by Natsume.

Reception
Heroes of the Lance was very successful for SSI, with 88,808 copies sold for computers in North America. After reviewing a pre-production copy of the DOS version of Heroes of the Lance, the magazine G.M. praised its graphics and "excellent" audio and said that "it would undoubtedly go straight to the top of the computer games charts and stay there for several months. Its THAT good." Computer Gaming World gave the DOS version of the game a similarly positive review. Electronic Gaming Monthly columnist Seanbaby listed the NES version as the 2nd worst NES game, and as the 11th worst video game. Levi Buchanan, in a classic Dungeons & Dragons videogame retrospective for IGN, wrote that "If you don't plan well, you can lose a lot of heroes in a very short period of time. This offered a slight strategy angle, but D&D fans largely preferred the Pool of Radiance straight RPG approach." (Pool of Radiance sales were triple that of Heroes of the Lance.) According to GameSpy, "While the game was actually a fairly decent side-scroller for its time, the frustrating level of difficulty, along with the fact that you couldn't save the game, meant that most gamers gave this game a miss."

Legacy
The storyline for this game continued in two subsequent video games, Dragons of Flame and Shadow Sorcerer.

References

Sources

 alternate html version of the review.

External links

 Images of Heroes of the Lance package, manual and screen
Review in Info
Review in Page 6

1988 video games
Action-adventure games
Amiga games
Amstrad CPC games
Atari ST games
Commodore 64 games
DOS games
Dragonlance video games
FM Towns games
MSX2 games
NEC PC-8801 games
NEC PC-9801 games
Nintendo Entertainment System games
Master System games
Side-scrolling video games
Single-player video games
Strategic Simulations games
Tiertex Design Studios games
U.S. Gold games
Video games developed in Japan
Video games developed in the United Kingdom
Video games featuring female protagonists
Video games scored by Iku Mizutani
ZX Spectrum games